Jim Wood (born April 10, 1960) is an American politician currently serving in the California State Assembly. He is a Democrat representing the 2nd Assembly District, which encompasses all of Del Norte, Trinity, Humboldt and Mendocino counties, plus northern and coastal Sonoma County, including the northern half of Santa Rosa.

Prior to being elected to the Assembly in 2014, he was the Mayor of Healdsburg and a family dentist. He also served on the Healdsburg City Council for 8 years from 2006 to 2014.

In addition to his work as a member of the Assembly, he has worked as a forensic dentist for five Northern California counties, establishing a mass disaster identification team in California and helped pass state legislation to standardize county identification procedures, a model now adopted by other states. He has been called to support efforts to identify victims of disasters including 9/11, Hurricane Katrina, the Valley Fire in Lake County and other wildfires in northern California, including the Camp Fire.

Wood was appointed chair of the Assembly Health Committee in the first quarter of 2016 and focuses on issues related to increasing access to quality, affordable health care. He notes his most significant accomplishment to date has been the creation of the Office of Health Care Affordability, signed by Governor Gavin Newsom on June 30, 2022, and is contained in the budget bill, SB 184 (see Section 19).

Wood represents an area of Northern California that has experienced some of the largest wildfires in the state, including the August Complex, Mendocino Complex, LNU Lightning and Monument. He has successfully sought billions in state funding for fire prevention, vegetation management and home hardening and created a separate entity within the State Fire Marshal to focus on planning and prevention activities.

Wood also authored a bill, AB 890, signed by Governor Gavin Newsom, that allows nationally certified nurse practitioners, after completing specific transition requirements, to practice to the full scope of their license independent of physician oversight. He has said increasing the number of primary care health care practitioners is needed to increase access to care for people in California, especially in underserved and rural areas.

2006 Healdsburg City Council Election

2010 Healdsburg City Council Election

2014 California State Assembly

2016 California State Assembly

2018 California State Assembly

2020 California State Assembly

References

External links 
 
 Campaign website

Democratic Party members of the California State Assembly
1960 births
Living people
People from Turlock, California
People from Healdsburg, California
Mayors of places in California
Loma Linda University alumni
University of California, Riverside alumni
21st-century American politicians